Chen Tao (born 3 May 1995) is a Chinese footballer who currently plays as a midfielder for Hefei City.

Club career
Chen Tao joined Chinese Super League side Shanghai Shenhua youth academy from Shanghai Luckystar in 2014. In 2015 he was loaned to Shanghai Shenhua's satellite team CF Crack's in the Primera Regional of Valencia. He was promoted to Shanghai Shenhua's first team squad by Francis Gillot in the summer of 2015. On 19 August 2017, he made his debut for Shanghai Shenhua in a 3–0 home defeat against Guangzhou Evergrande, coming on as a substitute for Wang Shouting in the 72nd minute. He was demoted to the reserved team in 2018.

On 26 February 2019, Chen was loaned to China League Two side Jilin Baijia for the 2019 season. On his return to Shanghai he remained in the reserves and was allowed to join fourth tier club Wuxi Xinje for the 2020 Chinese Champions League, which he was able to aid them gain promotion at the end of the season. The following campaign he joined another lower league team in Yunnan Yukun Steel and then Hefei City.

Career statistics
.

References

External links
 

1995 births
Living people
Chinese footballers
People from Chaohu
Footballers from Anhui
Shanghai Shenhua F.C. players
Chinese Super League players
Chinese expatriate footballers
Expatriate footballers in Spain
Chinese expatriate sportspeople in Spain
Association football midfielders